Crook County may refer to:

 Crook County, Oregon, United States
 Crook County, Wyoming, United States
 USS Crook County (LST-611), a United States Navy tank landing ship
 Crook County, a 2008 album by The Dirtball
 Crook County, a 2017 album by American rapper Twista

See also
Cook County (disambiguation)